Ewa Aganyin (also spelled as Ewa Agoyin) is a street food commonly eaten across Nigeria. The dish consists of beans cooked until extremely soft and then mashed. Other ingredients, such as bell peppers, onion, ginger, dried chilies and palm oil, are added to form a stew. It is commonly eaten with bread, a popular combination in Africa. 

Ewa aganyin is similar to adalu, which is made with beans and corn.

See also
 List of street foods

References 

Nigerian cuisine
Legume dishes
Street food
Yoruba cuisine